The GeeksPhone One is an Android-powered smartphone developed and marketed by GeeksPhone. It is aimed at power users; GeeksPhone claims it to be the first Android phone which is not locked down but gives users full access to the operating system and even encourages modifying it. The device was originally priced at €300 in the EU, lowered to €160 in December 2010, and is currently out of stock.

Hardware
 GPS with DGPS (WAAS/EGNOS)
 3-axis accelerometer
 Retractile stylus

Hardware specifications of the One were changed at various stages after its announcement: 
 The original prototype looked similar to the Samsung Omnia and lacked a physical keyboard, the final design was adopted later. 
 A DVB-T tuner, although initially announced, is not found in the final product.
 A second, front-facing camera for use in video calls was also mentioned before the release and is clearly visible next to the earpiece in photos of prototypes, although reportedly disabled in initial software releases. The final product lacks this second camera.
 The first releases were shipped with 256 MB ROM; later models are equipped with 512 MB.

Software
The GeeksPhone One originally shipped with a customized build of Android 1.6 “Donut”; updates to later Android versions are available. The system image also includes closed-source Android components, as well as some commercial third-party applications.

Philosophy
The GeeksPhone One is the first handset produced by GeeksPhone. The company claims it to be the first Android-powered handset which allows the user to modify operating system components without having to root the device first. New OS images can easily be installed on the device; the company operates a wiki and a forum for users to share knowledge. However, unlike similar efforts such as Openmoko, GeeksPhone does not publish details on the phone's hardware beyond common technical specifications.

Another difference to Openmoko is that GeeksPhone aims to provide a stable device suitable for everyday use and capable of competing with other commercial devices on the market. The GeeksPhone One ships with an Android version which has undergone quality tests and passed Android Open Source Project (AOSP) Code Compliance certification, allowing it to include closed-source Android components and participate in Android Market.

As of July 2010, the GeeksPhone is not available through any of the big mobile operators. While GeeksPhone does not rule out cooperation with operators, CEO Javier Agüera has stated that the “freedom-based” business model would have priority over any such agreement.

Certified Community Release program
In July 2010, GeeksPhone announced their Certified Community Release (CCR) program. CCRs are Android ports developed by the community and subsequently certified by GeeksPhone. Releases may be certified as “stable” or “beta”. While full credit is given to the developer, GeeksPhone will give technical support to users of these builds and flash phones with a CCR if requested by the customer. Use of a CCR will not void the warranty of the phone.

Developers can get technical support from GeeksPhone and major contributors may receive an additional free handset for development from GeeksPhone and, in some cases, sponsorships.

GeeksPhone initially announced that phones would not yet ship with CCRs preinstalled; however, as of at least October 2010, phones have been shipped with a CCR based on Android 2.2 (Froyo).

Market availability and clones
GeeksPhone sells the One in Europe and Latin America. In Russia, computer discounter Vobis distributes the GeeksPhone One under the name Highscreen Zeus, apparently with a different software package than the original GeeksPhone One. In Taiwan and Hong Kong, it is marketed by FarEastOne under the name Commtiva Z1, with a Chinese keyboard.

The Acer neoTouch P300 appears to have identical hardware but runs Windows Mobile.

See also
Google Nexus
Galaxy Nexus

References

External links
 

Android (operating system) devices
Mobile phones with an integrated hardware keyboard
Smartphones